Claude Frederick Bennett (September 19, 1936 – March 20, 2020) was a politician in Ontario, Canada. He served in the Legislative Assembly of Ontario from 1971 to 1987, and as cabinet minister in the governments of Bill Davis and Frank Miller. He was a Progressive Conservative Party member.

Background
Bennett was born in Ottawa, Ontario.  He was educated at the High School of Commerce and worked as an insurance agent. He also served as director of the Central Canada Exhibition Association from 1965 to 1978 and was president of the Ottawa Sooner Jr. Football Club from 1965 to 1973.

Politics
He served as an alderman and city controller in Ottawa from 1961 to 1969, having first been elected to city council in 1960. He was the city's acting mayor in the period from 1970 to 1972.

Bennett was elected to the Ontario legislature in the 1971 provincial election, winning a convincing victory in Ottawa South.  He served concurrently as MPP and on the Ottawa Board of Control before resigning as controller in August 1972 following the passing of a provincial law forbidding MPPs to serve on municipal councils at the same time. He was appointed as a Minister without portfolio in Davis's government on September 28, 1972, and was promoted to Minister of Industry and Tourism on January 15, 1973.  He was re-elected by a reduced majority in the 1975 election, and again with a convincing majority in 1977.  On January 21, 1978, he was named Minister of Housing.

After six years of governing in a minority parliament, Davis's PCs were returned with a majority government in the 1981 election.  Bennett was again returned for Ottawa South, and was named Minister of Municipal Affairs and Housing.  He served in this position for the remainder of the Davis years.

Bennett was on the right-wing of the Progressive Conservative party and was a prominent supporter of Frank Miller at the party's January 1985 leadership convention. When Miller became Premier of Ontario on February 8, 1985, he named Bennett as his Minister of Tourism and Recreation.

The PCs were reduced to a tenuous minority government under Miller's leadership in the 1985 provincial election, and Bennett retained his seat by only 1,337 votes (39.4%) against Liberal Party challenger Andrew Caddell (35.3%).  He continued to serve as Minister of Tourism and Recreation and was also named Chair of Cabinet, but he accomplished little in this position before the Miller government was defeated in the house in June 1985. In opposition, Bennett served as his party's Critic for Industry and Trade. He supported Larry Grossman for the party leadership in November 1985, and did not run for re-election in 1987.

Cabinet positions

Corporate appointments and death
From 1990 to 1995, Bennett served as chairman of the board for the Canada Mortgage and Housing Corporation. He was president of the Commonwealth Games Association of Canada since 1998 and also served as chair of the Ottawa Transition Board and the Ottawa Airport Authority. On June 29, 2007, he was appointed to sit on the board of directors of the Royal Canadian Mint for a four-year term.

Bennett died in the early morning of March 20, 2020, from a heart attack.

References

Notes

Citations

External links

1936 births
2020 deaths
Members of the Executive Council of Ontario
Ottawa city councillors
Ottawa controllers
Progressive Conservative Party of Ontario MPPs